Giubicolanta is a monotypic moth genus of the family Noctuidae. Its only species, Giubicolanta orientalis, is found in Somalia and Somaliland. Both the genus and species were first described by Emilio Berio in 1937.

References

Endemic fauna of Somalia
Acontiinae
Monotypic moth genera